Kamenná is a municipality and village in České Budějovice District in the South Bohemian Region of the Czech Republic. It has about 300 inhabitants.

Administrative parts
Villages of Klažary and Kondrač are administrative parts of Kamenná.

References

Villages in České Budějovice District